Boris Stefanov Mateev (also known as Boris Ștefanov, Draganov or Dragu; , Boris Stefanov Mateev; October 8, 1883 – October 11, 1969) was a Romanian communist politician, who served as general secretary of the Romanian Communist Party (PCR or PCdR) from 1936 to 1940.

Biography

Early life and activism
Stefanov was born into a wealthy landowning family in Kotel, Bulgaria. After the fire of Kotel of 1894, his family moved to Tsar Boris, Southern Dobrudja. After finishing high school he worked as a teacher, and between 1903 and 1905 he was drafted, serving in the Sofia Fortress Battalion, rising to the rank of lieutenant. Stefanov was introduced to socialist ideas at an early age by his sister Anna, secretary of the Varna organization of the Bulgarian Workers' Social Democratic Party (BRSDP) and delegate to the party's congress in 1903. Around the turn of the century, Boris, along with his sister and Georgi Bakalov, was part of a group smuggling illegal literature to Russia. In 1904 he made an application for membership in the "Narrow Socialists", the radical wing that emerged from the BRSDP split in the previous year.

During the Balkan Wars, he commanded an artillery battery on the Black Sea coast, near Varna. The Treaty of Bucharest, which concluded the wars in 1913, awarded Stefanov's home village, along with all Southern Dobruja, to Romania. Consequently, he decided to remain in his home region. With the help of socialist activist Christian Rakovsky, allegedly a relative, he joined the Social Democratic Party of Romania (PSD) in September 1913, taking part in its activities and collaborating with its press. During this period, his views were strongly influenced by the theory of "Neo-serfdom" developed by Romanian socialist patriarch Constantin Dobrogeanu-Gherea. Stefanov also continued to collaborate with the various socialist groups across the border (the "Narrows", the "Broad Socialists" and the Bulgarian Agrarian National Union). After the First World War erupted, he supported the pacifist stance of PSD; nevertheless, he was mobilized as infantry lieutenant in the Romanian Army once Romania joined the war in 1916. Due to his continued socialist propaganda among the soldiers, he was moved around several units, and ultimately interned.

Despite his Bulgarian origin, he spoke fluent Romanian. Stefanov allegedly engaged in activities for regional self-determination (see Internal Dobrujan Revolutionary Organisation). He reportedly went into bankruptcy, and had to renounce much of his inheritance.

Having also joined the Socialist Party of Romania (PS), Stefanov became a successful candidate for Parliament, but, together with Gheorghe Cristescu and Alexandru Dobrogeanu-Gherea, he was not validated into office. He later became critical of the PS's moderate wing, and supported a Bolshevik program.  At the time, he began campaigning for a land reform, arguing that the one planned by the Alexandru Averescu government and carried out by Ion I. C. Brătianu was far from sufficient. As a member in the General Council of the PS, Stefanov took part in the drafting of the manifesto that initiated the general strike of 1920. As a result, he was imprisoned in Jilava under the accusation of communism. While the arrest prevented him from participating at the PCR's founding Congress, he fully endorsed its decisions.

Indicted in the Dealul Spirii Trial  and subject to an amnesty, Stefanov was elected to the General Council of the Party at its second Congress of 1922. During the same year, he represented the minor faction in the Chamber of Deputies and was its envoy to the Comintern.

Stefanov and Romanian Communism
Although, like Cristescu, he was criticized by the Comintern for his allegedly minimalist outlook, he rose to the leadership of the PCR soon after the party was outlawed in 1924, and was known at the time under various pseudonyms (including Popescu, Draganov, and Dragu). Again arrested in 1926, after a Siguranța Statului crackdown, Stefanov was among those exposed after authorities pressured one of his comrades to hand out the names of all PCR leaders. Supported by the International Red Aid with interventions from Marcel Pauker (the French lawyer, Maurice Juncker, solicited, was forbidden to appear before the court by the Romanian authorities and expelled from Romania, he was nonetheless sentenced for treason during a trial he faced in Cluj (the other person indicted, Vasile Luca, was acquitted).

After many party activists, including the entire Politburo, took refuge to the Soviet Union, Stefanov, who was eventually set free, stood as leader of the local Secretariat (together with Pavel Tcacenko). He maintained his leadership position after Vitali Holostenco was appointed general secretary, although he ensured close contacts with David Fabian, Holostenco's rival.

Stefanov led the Romanian delegation to the Fifth and Seventh Comintern World Congresses, after the formation of Popular Fronts was decided by Joseph Stalin; despite his foreign origin, he was perceived as a local member of the PCR, and became general secretary with the deposition of Alexander Stefanski (part of a Soviet-endorsed move allowing more autonomy to the Romanian section). At the Seventh Congress he was also elected a member in the Executive Committee of the Communist International, entering its presidium, where he remained until August 1941. Subsequently, Stefanov engaged in a campaign against alleged Trotskyists, mirroring Soviet measures that led to the Great Purge; a committed Stalinist, he accused both Elena Filipescu and Marcel Pauker of having sided with Leon Trotsky.

Although himself under suspicion from Soviet overseers, he fled to Moscow in 1938, after PCR activities had been made virtually impossible by authorities of the National Renaissance Front.

Exile and later polemics
Removed from the party's leadership in 1940, he was denounced in 1951 by the Central Committee of the PCR, which accused him of having been "divorced from the working class", of having introduced the theory of "neo-serfdom" (see Constantin Dobrogeanu-Gherea), as well as of having advocated a "liquidationist" policy of a united front with bourgeois parties in 1927. The actual leadership of the PCR inside Romania was taken over by Bela Breiner from 1938 until his death in 1940 and then by Ştefan Foriş.

Stefanov was a friend of Georgi Dimitrov, who is credited with having rescued him from an almost certain doom after 1938. He spent the last decades of his life living in exile in Sofia, Bulgaria. In subsequent periods, Stefanov's image and status remained the subject of allegations inside Communist Romania: in 1961, the high-ranking Communist activist Valter Roman, who had been himself disgraced and rehabilitated by Gheorghe Gheorghiu-Dej, spoke out against former Communist politicians who had been purged at various stages, Stefanov included; he was interrupted by Petre Borilă, who notably added a claim that Stefanov had admired Nazism and had seen in it a path to a socialist economy.

On his 80th birthday in 1963, the Bulgarian Communist government awarded Stefanov the country's top honour, the Order of Georgi Dimitrov. The award was viewed as a deliberate attempt to irritate Romania's leadership, and a sign of cooling relations between the PCR and the Bulgarian Communist Party. During the later part of his life, Stefanov collaborated with several Bulgarian newspapers and magazines, and also participated in friendship committees seeking to strengthen Bulgaria's relation with Romania, the Soviet Union, and Yugoslavia. He died in a car accident in October 1969.

Notes

References
"Bulgaria. The Bulgarian Communist Party", September 11, 1964, at the Blinken Open Society Archives
"Disgraced Romanian Decorated in Bulgaria", September 4, 1963, at the Blinken Open Society Archives
 Trendafila Angelova, "Boris Stefanov", in Izvestiya na Instituta za istoriya na BKP, 51, 1984. p. 351-358.
 Cristina Diac, "Lupta pentru putere în Partidul Comunist" ("The Power Struggle inside the Communist Party"), in Jurnalul Național, January 12, 2005
Victor Frunză, Istoria stalinismului în România ("The History of Stalinism in Romania"), Humanitas, Bucharest, 1990
 Valter Roman, "Address to the Party Leadership" (December 1961), at Sfera Politicii
Vladimir Tismăneanu, Stalinism pentru eternitate, Polirom, Iași, 2005  (translation of Stalinism for All Seasons: A Political History of Romanian Communism, University of California Press, Berkeley, 2003)
 Ilarion Țiu, "Aliatul lui Stalin" ("Stalin's Ally"), in Jurnalul Național, June 7, 2005

People from Kotel, Bulgaria
People from Kavarna
1883 births
1969 deaths
Bulgarian people of the Balkan Wars
Bulgarian communists
Bulgarian journalists
Dealul Spirii Trial
General Secretaries of the Romanian Communist Party
Members of the Chamber of Deputies (Romania)
People convicted of treason against Romania
Recipients of the Order of Georgi Dimitrov
Road incident deaths in Bulgaria
Bulgarian Comintern people
Romanian Comintern people
Romanian military personnel of World War I
Romanian exiles
Romanian people of Bulgarian descent
Social Democratic Party of Romania (1910–1918) politicians
20th-century journalists